Ambulyx staudingeri is a species of moth of the family Sphingidae first described by Walter Rothschild in 1894. It is known from the Philippines.

Description 
It is similar to Ambulyx pryeri, but the posterior third of the forewing upperside subterminal line is closer to the termen, and most specimens have a dark tornal shade. The species name honours Otto Staudinger.

Gallery

References

Ambulyx
Moths described in 1894
Moths of Asia